
Gmina Ślesin is an urban-rural gmina (administrative district) in Konin County, Greater Poland Voivodeship, in west-central Poland.

Villages
Apart from the town of Ślesin, Gmina Ślesin contains the villages and settlements of Biele, Biskupie, Biskupie Sarnowskie, Bylew, Bylew-Parcele, Dąbrowa Duża, Dąbrowa Mała, Florentynowo, Głębockie Drugie, Głębockie Pierwsze, Głębockie-Witalisów, Goranin, Goraninek, Holendry Wąsowskie, Honoratka, Honoratka-Władysławów, Ignacewo, Julia, Kępa, Kijowiec, Kijowiec-Ściany, Kijowiec-Szyszynek, Kijowskie Nowiny, Kolebki, Kolebki-Frąsin, Kolebki-Ługi, Konstantynówek, Konstantynowo, Leśnictwo, Licheń Stary, Lizawy, Lubomyśle, Marianowo, Mikorzyn, Niedźwiady, Niedźwiady Małe, Ostrowąż, Ostrowąż-Giętkowo, Ostrowąż-Kolonia, Ostrowy, Piotrkowice, Pogoń Gosławicka, Pogoń Lubstowska, Pogoń-Leśniczówka, Pogorzele, Półwiosek Lubstowski, Półwiosek Nowy, Półwiosek Stary, Rębowo, Różnowa, Różopole, Sarnowa, Sarnowa-Kolonia, Smolniki, Smolniki Polskie, Szyszyn, Szyszyn-Helenowo, Szyszyn-Pole, Szyszyn-Teodorowo, Szyszynek, Szyszyńskie Holendry, Tokary, Wąsosze, Wierzelin, Wygoda and Żółwiniec.

Neighbouring gminas
Gmina Ślesin is bordered by the city of Konin and by the gminas of Kazimierz Biskupi, Kleczew, Kramsk, Skulsk, Sompolno, Wierzbinek and Wilczyn.

References
Polish official population figures 2006

Slesin
Konin County